Babian (also Romanized as Bābīān) is a village in Lahrud Rural District, Meshgin-e Sharqi District, Meshgin Shahr County, Ardabil Province, Iran. At the 2006 census, its population was 43, in 9 families.

References 

Towns and villages in Meshgin Shahr County